Mete Levent Topsakal (born 9 June 1966 in İstanbul, Turkey) is a former professional basketball player from Turkey and currently assistant manager of Turkey national basketball team. He played as a point and shooting guard at height 1,90 m.

External links
TurkSports.Net Profile
TBLStat.net Profile

1966 births
Living people
Turkish men's basketball players
Turkish basketball coaches
Fenerbahçe men's basketball players
Galatasaray S.K. (men's basketball) players
Tofaş S.K. players
Beşiktaş men's basketball players
İstanbul Teknik Üniversitesi B.K. players